Due to its status, the European Union (EU) is not party to the International Criminal Court (ICC), but all the EU's member states are signatories and the EU has been one of the ICC's strongest supporters. The EU has given political, financial and technical support to the court, which is also based in its territory (The Hague, the Netherlands).

Positions and agreements
In 2001 the EU agreed a common position, that is it has an EU-wide agreed foreign policy on the matter, strongly supporting the ICC. That position was updated in 2003 and combined with an action plan.

A 2006 co-operation agreement between the EU and ICC also obliges the EU and its members to assist the ICC, particularly by handing over classified information to the court. Examples of this cooperation already include supporting the ICC in the Democratic Republic of the Congo and Darfur, the latter including the EU Satellite Centre providing imagery and reports.

The Cotonou Agreement which the EU has with the African, Caribbean and Pacific Group of States includes a binding article signalling support of those states for the ICC and that they should "take steps towards ratifying and implementing the Rome Statute and related instruments". The EU has been inserting similar clauses in its association agreements and trade agreements around the world.

Financial backing
All its member states have signed and ratified the Rome Statute (which established the court, having come into force in 2002) and hence, due to the lack of other major powers being members, the EU is now the largest financial contributor to the court (before the accession of Japan in 2007, this was 75.6%. Afterwards, still 57.4%). The EU also funds organisations promoting the court.

Diplomatic backing
The EU has been the strongest supporter of the ICC and has supported it in nearly every instance. In ways it has operated as a public relations branch of the ICC and encouraged states around the world to adopt the Rome Statute (including putting it in trade agreements, as mentioned above). Due to the difficulty of the court's work, and opposition from major powers such as the US, this support has been indispensable and, likewise, the EU has been using the ICC as a tool to make its presence felt.

References

European Union and third organisations
International Criminal Court